Buxted railway station is on the  branch of the Oxted Line in England, serving the village of Buxted, East Sussex.

The station and all trains that call are operated by Southern.

History

The station was opened by the Brighton, Uckfield and Tunbridge Wells Railway on 3 August 1868. It became part of London, Brighton and South Coast Railway in 1859.

In 1990 the line between Crowborough and Uckfield was reduced from two tracks to one.

Facilities
The station has a ticket office which is staffed during Monday-Saturday mornings (Mon-Fri 05:55-12:30, Sat 06:30-13:05). At other times, the station is unstaffed and tickets can be purchased from the self-service ticket machine at the station.

The station has passenger help points and covered seating areas available on its platform. There are also toilets at the station. The station has a free car park and taxi-rank at its main entrance. There is also a small cycle rack at the entrance to the station.

Step free access is available to the platform at Buxted.

Services 
All services at Buxted are operated by Southern using  DMUs.

The typical off-peak service in trains per hour is:
 1 tph to  via 
 1 tph to 
 
Services increase to 2 tph in each direction during the peak hours.
 
On Sundays, the northbound service runs as far as Oxted only.

References

External links 

Railway stations in East Sussex
Former London, Brighton and South Coast Railway stations
Railway stations in Great Britain opened in 1868
Railway stations served by Govia Thameslink Railway
railway station